USS Pegasus is the name of two ships of the United States Navy:

  was a cargo ship in naval service 1941–46.
  was the lead Pegasus-class hydrofoils, operated by the U.S. Navy 1974–1993.

See also
 , a series of U.S. Navy patrol boats
 , the name of several British Royal Navy ships
 Pegasus (disambiguation)

United States Navy ship names